The Asus ZenWatch is an Android Wear-based smartwatch announced on September 3, 2014 at IFA and released by Asus on November 9, 2014. It uses Android Wear, a modified version of Android designed specifically for smartwatches and other wearables. ASUS also provides a custom app manager for this watch called the ZenWatch manager. 

For health tracking, you can use the ASUS ZenFit app as well as other health apps including Google Fit. It is compatible with all smartphones running Android 4.3 or higher that support Bluetooth LE. Android Wear features a notification system based on Google Now technology that enables it to receive spoken commands from the user.

Certification
The ZenWatch has IP55 certification for resistance to water jets. It has a user-replaceable buckle-based strap. The watch has a small power key but an always-on display. 

The original ZenWatch was succeeded by the ZenWatch 2; both are square-shaped. On November 11, 2016, ASUS released the ZenWatch 3 that has a round face. One feature that distinguishes the ZenWatch 3 from many smartwatches is that you can charge it to 60% charge in only 15 minutes.

Reception
The Verge praised the design, bright display and the comfort on the wrist, but disliked the inaccurate pedometer and short battery life, and said Android Wear's interface still needs work.

References

External links

Fitbit Smartwatches
Audemars Piguet Watches

Android (operating system) devices
Products introduced in 2014
Wear OS devices
Smartwatches